The Fearless is an epithet which may refer to:

Gerald the Fearless (died probably 1173), Portuguese warrior and folk hero of the Reconquista
John the Fearless (1371–1419), Duke of Burgundy
Richard I, Duke of Normandy (933–996)

See also

Fearless (disambiguation)
List of people known as the Brave
List of people known as the Courageous
List of people known as the Valiant

Lists of people by epithet